The men's super heavyweight boxing competition at the 2016 Olympic Games in Rio de Janeiro was held from 9 to 21 August at the Riocentro.

Tony Yoka won the gold medal, beating Joe Joyce in the final.

The medals for the competition were presented by Irena Szewińska, Poland, IOC member, and the gifts were presented by Kelani Bayor, Vice President of the AIBA.

Schedule 
All times are Brasília Time (UTC−3).

Results

Finals

Top half

Bottom half

References

Boxing at the 2016 Summer Olympics
Men's events at the 2016 Summer Olympics